My Feet Are Smiling is American guitarist Leo Kottke's sixth album, and his second album recorded live. It reached No. 108 on the Billboard Pop Albums charts.

History
The songs were recorded December 19 and 20, 1972 at the Tyrone Guthrie Theater in Minneapolis, Minnesota, the majority of the album's content being from the second night. "Blue Dot" was written three days before the concert.

The album was re-issued on CD in 1994 by BGO and in 1996 by One Way Records.

Reception

For AllMusic, Mark Allen wrote: "The prodigious technique, deadpan sense of humor, and infamous singing are all evident less than a minute into the opening tune. Performing solo and playing more slide guitar than usual, Kottke wows a supportive hometown audience in Minneapolis with some of the finest playing of his career."

Track listing
All pieces by Leo Kottke except as noted.

Side one
 "Hear the Wind Howl" – 3:10
 "Busted Bicycle" – 2:40
 "Easter" – 3:19
 "Louise" (Paul Siebel) – 4:26
 "Blue Dot" – 2:58
 "Stealing" – 3:03
 "Living in the Country" (Pete Seeger) – 1:38

Side two
 "June Bug" – 2:06
 "Standing in My Shoes" (Leo Kottke, Denny Bruce) – 2:50
 "The Fisherman" – 2:43
 "Bean Time" – 2:15
 "Eggtooth" (Leo Kottke, Michael Johnson) – 5:15
 Medley: "Crow River Waltz" / "Jesu, Joy of Man's Desiring" (Johann Sebastian Bach) / "Jack Fig"  – 7:20

Charts

Personnel
Leo Kottke - 6- & 12-string guitar, vocals

Production notes
Recorded on location and mastered by Sound 80, Minneapolis, Minnesota
Engineer - Paul "Spockets" Martinson
Art Direction and Design - John Van Hamersveld
Photography - Norman Seeff 
Producer - Denny Bruce for Takoma Productions

References

External links
Leo Kottke's official site
Unofficial Leo Kottke web site (fan site)
The Capitol Years

1973 live albums
Leo Kottke albums
Capitol Records live albums
Albums produced by Denny Bruce